, or Guilty Gear DS, is a fighting game of the Guilty Gear series for the Nintendo DS. Modeled after Guilty Gear Isuka, its gameplay allows up to four player fights. It was the first versus fighting game for the Nintendo DS to be released outside Japan.

Guilty Gear: Dust Strikers is also the first Guilty Gear game so far to have mini-games, ranging from the Balance Game where the player must help a chibi Jam balance the falling items with her plate, to Venom's Billiards, which puts the player and opponent in a pool-style game. The boss of the game's Story and Arcade modes is Gig, an immense insect-like monster with an angel attached to its bottom half. The game has 21 playable characters in all, but only twenty story modes, as Robo-Ky has no story mode.

Characters

Sol Badguy
Ky Kiske
May
Millia Rage
Axl Low
Jam Kuradoberi
Potemkin
Chipp Zanuff
Eddie
Baiken
Faust
Testament
Anji Mito
Johnny
Venom
Dizzy
Slayer
I-No
Zappa
Bridget
Robo-Ky

Reception

Guilty Gear Dust Strikers received "mixed or average reviews", according to Metacritic.

References

External links
Game Page on IGN
X-Play Review 

2006 video games
Arc System Works games
Guilty Gear games
Majesco Entertainment games
Nintendo DS games
Nintendo DS-only games
Platform fighters
THQ games
Video games developed in Japan
Multiplayer and single-player video games